Mesocnemis is a genus of African damselflies in the white-legged damselfly family (Platycnemididae). They are commonly known as Riverjacks.

The genus contains the following species:

 Mesocnemis dupuyi Legrand, 1982 - Gambia Riverjack
 Mesocnemis robusta (Selys, 1886)
 Mesocnemis saralisa Dijkstra, 2008
 Mesocnemis singularis Karsch, 1891 - Common Riverjack, Savanna Brook-damsel, Savanna Stream-damsel
 Mesocnemis tisi Lempert, 1992 -  Liberian Riverjack

References

Platycnemididae
Zygoptera genera
Taxa named by Ferdinand Karsch
Taxonomy articles created by Polbot